Rooftree is a 1967 Swedish drama film directed by Jörn Donner. It is based on Sivar Arnér's 1963 novel Tvärbalk.

Cast
 Ulf Palme as Leo Wittö
 Harriet Andersson as Noomi Moldovan
 Gunnel Broström as Inez Wittö
 Ernst-Hugo Järegård as Magnus
 Brita Öberg as Leo's Mother
 Lars Göran Carlson as Dr. Liljefors (uncredited)
 Nils Eklund as Dr. Axing (uncredited)
 Barbro Nordin as Jörel (uncredited)
 Eva Stiberg as Nurse Greta (uncredited)

External links

1967 films
1967 drama films
Swedish drama films
Films directed by Jörn Donner
1960s Swedish films